Inge Ivarson (2 November 1917 – 22 June 2015) was a Swedish film producer and screenwriter. He produced 40 films between 1945 and 2004. He was born in Borås, Sweden.

Selected filmography
 The Girl from the Marsh Croft (1947)
 I Love You Karlsson (1947)
 A Swedish Tiger (1948)
 Big Lasse of Delsbo (1949)
 The Street (1949)
 Two Stories Up (1950)
 Sailors (1964)
 Här kommer bärsärkarna (1965)
 Morianna (1965)
 Language of Love (1969)
 The Lustful Vicar (1970)
 What the Swedish Butler Saw (1975)

External links

 Swedish Film Database with date of death

1917 births
2015 deaths
People from Borås
Swedish film producers
Swedish screenwriters
Swedish male screenwriters